Oh No! It's An Alien Invasion! is a Canadian animated television series which first aired on August 3, 2013, with its first season of 26 episodes. The series was created by Philippe Ivanusic-Vallee and Peter Ricq and produced by Nelvana Limited in association with YTV.

The series was pulled from YTV's schedule on August 30, 2014. The second season premiered on Teletoon on November 3, 2014. The series ended on April 27, 2015 and was canceled on April 30, 2015. 40 episodes were produced.

Cast
 Al Mukadam as Nate
 Dan Chameroy as Briiian
 Seán Cullen as Emperor Brainlius III
 Stacey DePass as Turret
 Barbara Mamabolo as Scoop
 Rob Tinkler as Shakes
 Ryan Cooley as Louis
 Brianna D'Aguanno as Lily

Series overview

Episodes

Season 1 (2013—14)

Season 2 (2015)

Broadcast

In the United Kingdom, it premiered on May 24, 2014 on POP and KIX. (now Pop Max.) It also aired on ABC3 (now ABC Me) in Australia. In the United States, it used to be on Netflix, until it was removed from the streaming service in 2020.

References

2013 Canadian television series debuts
2015 Canadian television series endings
2010s Canadian animated television series
2010s Canadian comic science fiction television series
YTV (Canadian TV channel) original programming
Television series by Nelvana
Canadian computer-animated television series
Canadian children's animated action television series
Canadian children's animated adventure television series
Canadian children's animated science fantasy television series
Canadian children's animated comic science fiction television series
Anime-influenced Western animated television series
English-language television shows